Snow Hill is a location in the City of London. Historically it was the site of one of the City of London water conduits, which on days of great celebration was made to run with red and white wine, the last occasion being the anniversary of the coronation of George I in 1727.

Holborn Viaduct railway station was at one time known as Snow Hill. Snow Hill Tunnel runs from here under Smithfield Market.

The Saracen's Head was a popular inn on Snow Hill from the Middle Ages to the 19th century.

Snow Hill Police Station is a Grade II listed building.

References

Streets in the City of London